is a town located in Miyagi Prefecture, Japan. , the town had an estimated population of 37,617, and a population density of 700 persons per km² in 15,590 households.

Geography
Shibata is located in south-central Miyagi Prefecture in the Tōhoku region of northern Japan. The Abukuma River runs through the town.

Neighboring municipalities
Miyagi Prefecture
Iwanuma
Kakuda
Natori
Ōgawara
Murata
Watari

Climate
Shibata has a humid climate (Köppen climate classification Cfa) characterized by mild summers and cold winters.  The average annual temperature in Shibata is 12.5 °C. The average annual rainfall is 1263 mm with September as the wettest month. The temperatures are highest on average in August, at around 24.9 °C, and lowest in January, at around 1.4 °C.

Demographics
Per Japanese census data, the population of Shibata increased throughout the 20th century and has declined slightly in the 21st.

History
The area of present-day Shibata was part of ancient Mutsu Province, and was part of the holdings of Sendai Domain under the Edo period Tokugawa shogunate. The villages of Funaoka and Tsukinoki were established on April 1, 1889 with the establishment of the post-Meiji restoration modern municipalities system. Tsukioki was promoted to town status on April 1, 1904 and Funaoka on November 3, 1941. The two towns merged to form Shibata on April 1, 1956.

Government
Shibata has a mayor-council form of government with a directly elected mayor and a unicameral town council of 18 members. Shibata, together with the rest of Shibata District, collectively contributes two seats to the Miyagi Prefectural legislature. In terms of national politics, the town is part of Miyagi 3rd district of the lower house of the Diet of Japan.

Economy
The economy of Shibata is largely based on agriculture.

Education
Sendai University
 Shibata has six public elementary schools and three public middle schools operated by the town government, and one public high school operated by the Miyagi Prefectural Board of Education. The prefecture also operates one special education school for the handicapped.

Transportation

Railway
 East Japan Railway Company (JR East) - Tōhoku Main Line
  - 
AbukumaExpress - Abukuma Express Line
  -

Highway

Local attractions
Site of Funaoka Castle

Sister city relations
 – Assis Chateaubriand (Paraná), Brazil  since April 13, 1981
 – Danyang, Jiangsu, China, since February 23, 1994 
 - Kitakami, Iwate, Japan, since January 25, 1980
 - Date, Hokkaido, Japan, since May 30, 1988 (friendship city)

References

External links

Official Website 

 
Towns in Miyagi Prefecture
Sendai University